The 1983–84 Hartford Whalers season was the Whalers' fifth season in the National Hockey League.

Offseason
In early May, the Whalers hired Emile Francis as president and general manager of the club. As a player, Francis was a goaltender who played with the Chicago Black Hawks and the New York Rangers from 1946 to 1952, in which he had a record of 32-52-10 and a 3.75 GAA in 95 games. Following his playing career, Francis was the head coach and general manager of the New York Rangers from 1965 to 1976, where he led the team to a 342-209-103 record. From 1970 to 1973, Francis led the Rangers to three consecutive 100+ point seasons. After he was relieved of his duties in January 1976, Francis joined the St. Louis Blues as general manager and executive vice-president. Francis also was the head coach of the team for 124 games, as St. Louis had a 46-64-14 record. Francis accepted the position with Hartford, as St. Louis was having severe financial problems during this time.

At the 1983 NHL Entry Draft held on June 8 at the Montreal Forum, the Whalers selected left winger Sylvain Turgeon from the Hull Olympiques of the QMJHL with their first round, second overall selection. Turgeon played in 67 games with Hull, scoring 54 goals and 163 points to lead the club in scoring. In eight playoff games, Turgeon scored eight goals and 15 points. Another notable selection by Hartford was defenseman Joe Reekie in the seventh round.

On June 24, the Whalers acquired left winger Norm Dupont from the Winnipeg Jets for a fourth round draft pick in the 1984 NHL Entry Draft. Dupont scored seven goals and 23 points in 39 games with the Jets during the 1982-83 season. In one playoff game, Dupont had a goal and an assist. In 1980-81, Dupont scored 27 goals and 53 points to finish third in team scoring.

On July 5, Hartford traded defenseman Mickey Volcan to the Calgary Flames in exchange for defensemen Richie Dunn and Joel Quenneville. Dunn played in all 80 games for Calgary in 1982-83, scoring three goals and 14 points. In nine playoff games, Dunn added a goal and two points. Quenneville spent the 1982-83 season with the New Jersey Devils before being traded to Calgary earlier in the off-season. In 74 games with New Jersey, Quenneville scored five goals and 17 points in their first season after they relocated from Colorado prior to the 1982-83 season.

Two days later, on July 7, Hartford hired Jack Evans as the head coach. Evans had previous NHL head coaching experience with the California Golden Seals and Cleveland Barons franchise from 1975 to 1978, where he led the club to a 74-129-37 record in their final three seasons before the team merged with the Minnesota North Stars. From 1978 to 1983, Evans was the head coach of the Salt Lake Golden Eagles of the Central Hockey League, where he led the club to the Adams Cup in 1980 and 1981. As a player, Evans played with the New York Rangers from 1948 to 1958, and the Chicago Black Hawks from 1958 to 1963. He won the Stanley Cup in 1961. In 754 career games, Evans scored 19 goals and 99 points, while in 56 playoff games, he had two goals and four points.

On August 19, the Whalers acquired center Steve Stoyanovich from the New York Islanders for a fifth round draft pick in the 1985 NHL Entry Draft. Stoyanovich spent the 1982-83 season with the Indianapolis Checkers of the CHL, scoring 41 goals and 84 points in 79 games. In 13 playoff games, Stoyanovich scored six goals and nine points.

On September 7, Hartford acquired right winger Tom Gorence from the Philadelphia Flyers for future considerations. Gorence had seven goals and 14 points in 53 games with the Flyers during 1982-83.

The Whalers reacquired defenseman Marty Howe on September 29, after receiving him from the Boston Bruins for future considerations. Howe had played with the Whalers from 1977 to 1982 before being traded after the 1981-82 season. In 78 games with Boston in 1982-83, Howe had a goal and 12 points, while in 12 playoff games, he earned an assist.

On the next day, September 30, Hartford acquired center Greg Malone from the Pittsburgh Penguins for a third round draft pick in the 1985 NHL Entry Draft. Malone finished third in Penguins team scoring during the 1982-83 season, scoring 17 goals and 61 points while playing in all 80 games.

The Whalers were busy on October 3, as they traded left winger Greg Adams to the Washington Capitals for left winger Torrie Robertson. Robertson appeared in only five games with Washington in 1982-83, scoring two goals. With the Hershey Bears of the AHL, Robertson scored 21 goals and 54 points in 69 games, while accumulating 187 penalty minutes. In five playoff games with Hershey, Robertson had a goal and three points.

Also on October 3, the Whalers participated in the NHL Waiver Draft, as they acquired center Mike Zuke and right wingers Bob Crawford and Mike Crombeen all from the St. Louis Blues. In 43 games, Zuke had eight goals and 24 points with the Blues in 1982-83. In 1980-81, Zuke finished tenth in the league in voting for the Selke Trophy. Crawford appeared in 27 games with St. Louis in 1982-83, scoring five goals and 14 points. Crombeen scored six goals and 17 points in 80 games with the Blues in 1982-83. Hartford lost defenseman Mark Renaud to the Buffalo Sabres in the draft.

Regular season

October
The Whalers opened the 1983-84 on the road on October 5 against the Buffalo Sabres, losing the game 5-3. Three nights later, the Whalers hosted the Boston Bruins for their home opener, as Hartford was led by two goals from Bob Crawford in a 4-3 win over the Bruins.

On October 19, Greg Millen stopped all 22 shots he faced in a 3-0 victory over the Washington Capitals, as Hartford improved to 3-2-1 early in the season. Later in the month, on October 25, the Whalers defeated the Los Angeles Kings 8-5, improving the Whalers to 4-3-1.

Hartford lost their last two games of the month, finishing October with a 4-5-1 record. The Whalers were in fourth place in the Adams Division and in the final playoff position, narrowly ahead of the last place Montreal Canadiens by 1 point.

November
Hartford moved into last place in the Adams Division on November 1, as they lost to the Montreal Canadiens 6-2 at the Montreal Forum. The Whalers responded to this by winning four of their next five games, including a 6-1 blowout victory over the Chicago Black Hawks on November 12 to improve to 8-7-1 to move back into fourth place in the division and hold on to the final playoff position. During this time, on November 10, the Whalers made a trade with the Winnipeg Jets. Hartford traded away goaltender Mark Veisor to the Jets for goaltender Ed Staniowski. Staniowski appeared in only one game with Winnipeg at the time of the trade during the 1983-84 season, going 0-0-0 with a 12.00 GAA and a .600 save percentage.

The Whalers then slumped by going winless in their next four games (0-3-1), dropping them back into last place. Hartford ended their winless skid with a 4-3 overtime win over the New York Rangers on November 26 as Blaine Stoughton scored the winning goal. In their final game of November, the Whalers lost to the Vancouver Canucks 6-2.

Hartford has a record of 5-6-1 during November, bringing their overall record to 9-11-2 through the month. The Whalers were in last place, three points behind the Montreal Canadiens for the fourth and final playoff position in the Adams Division.

December
The Whalers opened December with two straight victories, including a 7-2 victory over the St. Louis Blues on December 3 in which Mark Johnson recorded the Whalers first hat trick of the season. With the two victories, the Whalers improved to 11-11-5 on the season, earning 27 points, climbing to within one point of the Montreal Canadiens for the final playoff spot.

Hartford fell into a slump, going winless in their next seven games (0-6-1), dropping their record to 11-17-6, before snapping their slump with a 6-3 win over the Buffalo Sabres on December 22. The next night, the Whalers won their second in a row, defeating the Minnesota North Stars 5-3.

Following the Christmas break, Hartford lost their remaining three games in December, including a 9-3 loss to the Los Angeles Kings on December 30.

Hartford struggled to a 4-9-1 record in December. The Whalers had an overall record of 13-20-3, earning 29 points, as the club fell nine points behind the fourth place Montreal Canadiens for the final playoff spot.

January
Hartford began January the same way they ended December, with a blowout loss, as the Detroit Red Wings destroyed the Whalers 7-1 on January 3. In their next game, the Whalers ended their four-game losing skid with a 4-2 over the defending Stanley Cup champions, the New York Islanders.

The Whalers embarked on a five-game Western road trip, in which they opened it with a 5-3 loss against the Edmonton Oilers, followed by a 4-3 loss to the Winnipeg Jets. The Whalers managed to defeat the Minnesota North Stars in the third game of the trip, followed by a 3-3 tie against the Calgary Flames, however, the trip concluded with a 5-0 loss to the Vancouver Canucks.

The Whalers returned home for a three-game home stand, as the Whalers tied the New Jersey Devils 3-3, followed by two losses. Back on the road on January 24, the Whalers and Montreal Canadiens played to a 7-7 tie, in which the Whalers blew a two-goal lead in the final eight minutes of the game.

The winless streak continued to the end of the month, as Hartford lost to the Winnipeg Jets, followed by a loss and a tie in a home-and-home series against the Quebec Nordiques.

Hartford had a record of 2-8-4 in the month of January, bringing their overall record to 15-28-7, earning 37 points. The team remained in the cellar of the Adams Division, 16 points behind the fourth place Montreal Canadiens.

February
The Whalers opened February with a 6-6 tie against the Detroit Red Wings, extending their winless streak to 10 games. The Whalers then snapped out of their slump, with three consecutive victories, which was the first time that the club had a winning streak of three games during the season.

The winning streak was snapped on February 11 with a 6-3 loss to the Calgary Flames. On the next day, February 12, the Whalers earned their biggest victory of the season, as they shutout the best team in the NHL, the Edmonton Oilers, 11-0. During the game, Ron Francis and Greg Malone each earned a hat trick. Greg Millen stopped all 28 shots he faced to earn his second shutout of the season.

Following the big win against the Oilers, Hartford lost three of their next four games, with their only win an 8-2 victory over the Toronto Maple Leafs. The Whalers won two of their final three games of February, including a 9-7 win over the Philadelphia Flyers in which the teams combined for nine goals in the first period.

On February 27, the Whalers acquired defenseman Scot Kleinendorst from the New York Rangers in exchange for right winger Blaine Stoughton. Kleinendorst had two assists in 23 games with New York during the season. Also, on the same date, Hartford signed free agent Dave Tippett. Tippett represented Canada at the 1984 Winter Olympics, in which he scored a goal and two points in seven games.

Hartford had a winning record in February with a 7-5-1 record, making it the first time all season they finished above .500 in a month. The Whalers overall record at the end of February was 22-33-8, earning 52 points. The Whalers remained in last place, 11 points behind the Montreal Canadiens for the final playoff berth.

March/April
Hartford opened March with a tie and a victory over the Boston Bruins in a home-and-home series to try to stay alive in the playoff race. The club then lost their next four games, including a must-win game against the Montreal Canadiens, to fall 14 points out of the final playoff spot by the middle of the month.

With their playoff hopes gone, the Whalers finished the season on a positive note, going 5-5-1 in their final 11 games.

The Whalers finished March/April with a 6-9-2 record, bringing their final overall record to 28-42-10, earning 66 points, and finishing in last place in the Adams Division. Hartford finished nine points behind the Montreal Canadiens for the final playoff position.

Final standings

Schedule and results

Playoffs
Hartford failed to qualify for the post-season for the fourth consecutive season. The Whalers finished the season with a 28-42-10 record, earning 66 points, which was their highest point total since the 1979-80 season. The club finished nine points behind the fourth place Montreal Canadiens for the final playoff position in the Adams Division.

Player statistics

Awards and records

Transactions
The Whalers were involved in the following transactions during the 1983–84 season.

Trades

Waivers

Free agents

Draft picks
Hartford's draft picks at the 1983 NHL Entry Draft held at the Montreal Forum in Montreal, Quebec.

Farm teams

See also
1983–84 NHL season

References

External links

Hartford Whalers seasons
Hartford
Hartford
Hartford
Hartford